Vehicle is the debut studio album by the Ides of March, released in 1970. The single, "Vehicle", became the fastest selling single in Warner's history, after which the band was hustled into the studio to record a full album. Vehicle songs range through many genres including rock, pop, soul and folk.

Reception

In his retrospective review for Allmusic, critic Mark Deming wrote "the band sounds tight, enthusiastic, and emphatic on all ten tracks" and that the album "documents this band's limitations as well as its strengths, but ultimately it's a good week's work, and shows the Ides of March had more up their sleeve than their only hit." Conversely, Robert Christgau called the album "Schlocky... more schlock than anyone needs."

Track listing
All songs written by Jim Peterik, except where noted.
 "Vehicle" 2:56
 "Factory Band" 3:02
 "Sky Is Falling" 2:48
 "Home" 3:38
 "Wooden Ships/Dharma for One" (David Crosby, Stephen Stills, Paul Kantner / Ian Anderson, Clive Bunker) 7:14
 "Bald Medusa" (Mike Borch, Peterik) 3:02
 "Aire of Good Feeling" 3:14
 "Time for Thinking" (John Larson) 2:30
 "One Woman Man" 3:15
 "Symphony for Eleanor (Eleanor Rigby)" (John Lennon, Paul McCartney) 9:42

Bonus tracks
"Lead Me Home, Gently"
"Superman"
"Melody"
"Vehicle" (single version)
"High on a Hillside"

Personnel
Jim Peterik - lead guitar, lead vocals
Larry Millas - rhythm guitar, bass, keyboards, backing vocals
Bob Bergland - bass, saxophone, backing vocals
Ray Herr - bass, backing vocals
Michael Borch - drums, percussion
John Larson - trumpet, flugelhorn
Chuck Soumar - trumpet, backing vocals

Production
Produced By Bob Destocki & Frank Rand
Recorded & Engineered By Dick Dearborn & Richard Brayfield at Columbia Studios, March 1970

References

External links
Vehicle'' at songfacts.com
"Vehicle" at discogs

1970 debut albums
Warner Records albums
The Ides of March (band) albums